Lakewood may refer to:

Places

Australia 
 Lakewood, Western Australia, an abandoned town in Western Australia

Canada 
 Lakewood, Edmonton, Alberta
 Lakewood Suburban Centre, Saskatoon, Saskatchewan

Philippines 
 Lakewood, Zamboanga del Sur

United States 
 Lakewood, California, a city in Los Angeles County
 Lakewood, Colorado, a city in Jefferson County
 Lakewood, Illinois, a village in McHenry County
 Lakewood Balmoral Historic District, Chicago, Illinois
 Lakewood, Iowa, a ghost town in Lyon County
 Lakewood Township, New Jersey, a township
 Lakewood, New Orleans, Louisiana
 Lakewood, Michigan, an unincorporated community and abandoned summer resort by Long Lake
 Lakewood (CDP), New Jersey, a census-designated place in Lakewood Township, New Jersey
 Lakewood, New York, a village in Chautauqua County
 Lakewood, Ohio, a large city in Cuyahoga County, and part of the Greater Cleveland Metropolitan area
 Lakewood, Oregon
 Lakewood, Pennsylvania, a village in Wayne County
 Lakewood, South Carolina, a census-designated place in Sumter County
 Lakewood, Tennessee, a neighborhood of Nashville, once a small city
 Lakewood, Dallas, Texas, a neighborhood
 Lakewood, Washington, a city in Pierce County
 Lakewood, Wisconsin, a town in Oconto County
 Lakewood (CDP), Wisconsin, an unincorporated census-designated place in Oconto County

Fiction 
Lakewood, a fictional town where a string of murders take place in the MTV television series Scream
The Desperate Hour, a thriller starring Naomi Watts which premiered at the 2021 Toronto International Film Festival as Lakewood before being retitled in commercial release

Other uses 
 Lakewood (Livingston, Alabama), an antebellum mansion in Livingston, Alabama
 Lakewood (St. Joseph, Louisiana),  a mansion
 Lakewood / Fort McPherson station, a passenger rail station located in Atlanta, Georgia
 Lakewood station, a passenger rail station located in Lakewood, Washington
 Lakewood Church, a non-denominational megachurch in Houston, Texas

 Lakewood Industries, a division of Holley Performance Products, an American automotive performance company
 Lakewood Playhouse, a theatre in Lakewood, Washington
 Lakewood Assembly, a General Motors plant in Lakewood Heights, Atlanta, Georgia

See also 
 Lakewood Heights (disambiguation)
 Lakewood Historic District (disambiguation)
 Lakewood Park (disambiguation)
 Lakewood School District (disambiguation)
 Lakewood Township (disambiguation)
 Lakewood Village (disambiguation)
 
 
 Lake Wood, Texas
 Lake Wood (Philippines)